This is a partial chronological list of cases decided by the United States Supreme Court during the Warren Court, the tenure of Chief Justice Earl Warren, from October 5, 1953, through June 23, 1969.

References 

Warren
List